The 1998 Alaska Milkmen season was the 13th season of the franchise in the Philippine Basketball Association (PBA).

Two championships
Alaska won two titles in the year and on a quest for another Grandslam. In the All-Filipino Cup, the Milkmen won their first five games of the season.  They ended up with the best record in the elimination round with nine wins and two losses. In the semifinals, the San Miguel Beermen overtake Alaska and took the first finals seat. The Milkmen had to beat Sta.Lucia Realtors, 77-69, in their playoff game on April 21 for the right to face San Miguel in the finals. The best-of-seven title series features a duel of two American coaches; Tim Cone and Ron Jacobs. Alaska prevailed over San Miguel in seven games to repeat as champions and regain the All-Filipino crown.

Sean Chambers led Alaska to three straight wins in the Commissioners Cup. Their third victory was a come-from-behind 79-78 win over Pop Cola on May 31 as they await the arrival of their import choice Devin Davis. On June 2, Davis scored 24 points in his first game as Alaska defeated Ginebra, 89-80. The Milkmen were unbeaten in eight starts before losing back-to-back games to Mobiline and San Miguel. Alaska advances outright in the best-of-five semifinals and they battled Formula Shell and won the series, three games to two, to reach the finals for the 12th time in the last 13 conferences. 

In the championship rematch against San Miguel Beermen, the Milkmen took a commanding 2-0 lead and while the Beermen fought back to tie the series, the Milkmen came through with convincing victories in the last two games to clinch their 9th PBA title as they now tied the defunct Toyota ballclub as the third winningest team in the league.

Occurrences
Coach Tim Cone, who was task to handle the Philippine Centennial Team in the Asian Games, will not be on the Alaska bench along with national team players Johnny Abarrientos, Jojo Lastimosa and Kenneth Duremdes starting the special conference called Centennial Cup. Alaska players Gilbert Reyes and Richard Bachmann were assigned as interim coaches and to make up for the loss of key players, the Milkmen signed two returning cagers and they were Joey Loyzaga and Joseph Valdez.

Awards
Kenneth Duremdes won the season's Most Valuable Player (MVP) trophy.
MVP winner Kenneth Duremdes along with Johnny Abarrientos and Jojo Lastimosa were named in the Mythical first team.
Devin Davis was voted the Commissioner's Cup Best Import.

Roster

Team Manager: Joaquin Trillo

Transactions

Additions

Subtractions

Recruited imports

References 

Alaska Aces (PBA) seasons
Alaska